Oculinaria is a genus of ascidian tunicates in the family Styelidae.

Species within the genus Oculinaria include:
 Oculinaria australis Gray, 1868 
 Oculinaria occultare Monniot, 1991

References

Stolidobranchia
Tunicate genera